Reisdorf is a commune and small town in eastern Luxembourg, on the river Sauer. It is part of the canton of Diekirch.

In 2020, Reisdorf, which lies in the centre of the commune, had a population of 1276. Other towns within the commune include Bigelbach, Hoesdorf, and Wallendorf-Pont.

Population

Gallery

References

External links
 

Communes in Diekirch (canton)
Towns in Luxembourg